Igor Mezić is a mechanical engineer, mathematician, and Distinguished Professor of mechanical engineering and mathematics at the University of California, Santa Barbara. He is best known for his contributions to operator theoretic, data driven approach to dynamical systems theory  that he advanced via articles based on Koopman operator theory, and his work on theory of mixing, that culminated in work on microfluidic mixer design,  and mapping oil refuse from the Deepwater Horizon oil spill in the Gulf of Mexico to aid in cleaning efforts,.

He graduated from the Mechanical Engineering Department at University of Rijeka, Croatia in 1990, with a Diploma in Engineering, and got the Ph.D. degree from the California Institute of Technology (Caltech), within the Applied Mechanics program, with a thesis in Dynamical Systems Theory, in 1994, under supervision of Stephen R. Wiggins.

Mezić was a postdoctoral fellow at the Mathematics Institute of the University of Warwick in the UK from 1994 to 1995, and joined Mechanical Engineering Faculty at the University of California, Santa Barbara in 1995. He moved to the Division of Engineering and Applied Sciences at Harvard University in 2000  before returning to University of California, Santa Barbara, where he became a Full Professor in 2003.

Mezić has received numerous awards and honors for his research work in fields of physics, mathematics (Sloan Fellowship) and engineering. In 2015, he was elected Fellow of the American Physical Society, for "fundamental contributions to the theory of three-dimensional chaotic advection, measures and control of mixing, and development of a spectral operator theory approach to decomposition of complex fluid flows".
He was elected as a Fellow of the Society for Industrial and Applied Mathematics in 2017 (SIAM Fellow), "for sustained innovation at the dynamical systems theory/applications interface; notably for advances in the use of Koopman operator theory". In 2022, Mezić was elected Fellow of the Institute of Electrical and Electronics Engineers (IEEE) for contributions to modeling and control using Koopman operator techniques. In 2019, Mezic was inaugurated as the first ever Honoris Professor at his Alma Mater, University of Rijeka, Croatia. He is the recipient of the 2021 J. D. Crawford Prize, a biennial award presented by the Society for Industrial and Applied Mathematics (SIAM) for achievements in the field of dynamical systems.

Mezić is a holder of 10 US patents. Four technology companies – in Internet of Things, Ecorithm, (now  Pametan), Medical Diagnostics,     iFluidics, Artificial Intelligence, Aimdyn and Network Security,  Mixmode were founded on the basis of his patents and algorithms. Mezić continues his scientific work as director of the Center for Energy Efficient Design and a professor at  Departments of Mechanical Engineering and Mathematics at  University of California, Santa Barbara.

Mezić is currently involved in DARPA projects coupling his developments in operator theory, machine learning and Artificial Intelligence. He is applying this methodology in commercial developments in network security and Internet of Things domains.

Books 
Luca Cortelezzi (ed.), Igor Mezić (ed.): Analysis and Control of Mixing with an Application to Micro and Macro Flow Processes. Springer, 2009
Petros Koumoutsakos (ed.), Igor Mezić (ed.): Control of Fluid Flow. Springer 2010
Alexandre Mauroy (ed.), Igor Mezić (ed.), & Yoshihiko Susuki (ed.). The Koopman Operator in Systems and Control: Theory, Numerics, and Applications. Springer 2019.

References

 Igor Mezic UC Santa Barbara bio

External links

Living people
American mechanical engineers
20th-century American mathematicians
University of California, Santa Barbara faculty
Croatian emigrants to the United States
Fellows of the Society for Industrial and Applied Mathematics
Fellows of the American Physical Society
Sloan Research Fellows
1967 births
21st-century American mathematicians